Abacus Federal Savings Bank is an American bank founded in December 1984 by a group of business leaders from the Chinese American community in New York City.

Abacus was the only U.S. bank prosecuted in relation to the 2008 financial crisis; it was exonerated of all charges following a jury trial in 2015. The aggressive prosecution of Abacus, in contrast to the relatively lenient treatment received by the large banks, was questioned and criticized by various media outlets.

A documentary about the prosecution and exoneration of Abacus, Abacus: Small Enough to Jail, was nominated for the 2018 Academy Award for Best Documentary Feature.

Locations 
The bank has locations in New York, New Jersey, and Pennsylvania.

Other services 
Abacus has a wholly owned insurance subsidiary, the Abacus Insurance Agency Corp. (AIAC), which provides life, health, accident, and annuity insurance. Abacus is federally chartered. Its mortgage and other services extend to all states in the United States.

Prosecution and acquittal

Indictment 
In May 2012, New York prosecutors from the Manhattan District Attorney's office indicted the bank and 19 of its employees on charges of fraud in relation to hundreds of millions of dollars' worth of mortgages that had been sold to Fannie Mae between 2005 and 2010. The bank was accused of falsifying loan applications so that borrowers would qualify for mortgages. Abacus argued that it uncovered the improper behavior itself, reported it to the regulator, and fired the employee in question. It also said it was not involved with the fraudulent packaging of subprime mortgage securities and had a mortgage default rate of 0.5%, a tenth of the national average.

Verdict 
The bank, along with its former Chief Credit Officer and its former loan supervisor, were acquitted of all charges brought by the New York prosecutors in a jury trial in New York Supreme Court on June 3 and 4, 2015.

In media 
The aggressive prosecution of Abacus, in contrast to the relatively lenient treatment received by large banks, was questioned and criticized by various media outlets. It was criticized by journalist Matt Taibbi in his 2014 book The Divide: American Injustice in the Age of the Wealth Gap.
Jill Sung criticized the disparate treatment, including a perp walk, as blatant racism against Asian Americans.

The story is told in Steve James's feature-length documentary Abacus: Small Enough to Jail, which had its premiere at the Toronto International Film Festival, September 11, 2016.
It was broadcast nationally on PBS Frontline on September 12, 2017. Abacus: Small Enough to Jail was nominated for the 2018 Academy Award for Best Documentary Feature.

References

External links
 Official Website

Chinese-American culture in New Jersey
Banks based in New York City
Banks established in 1984
Chinese American banks
Chinese-American culture in New York City
Chinese-American culture in Pennsylvania
Privately held companies based in New Jersey
Privately held companies based in New York City
Privately held companies based in Pennsylvania
1984 establishments in New York City